Liam Hackett (born 19 January 1991, in St Helens) is an activist, entrepreneur and author best known as the founder and CEO of the global equality and anti-bullying charity Ditch the Label. Hackett is also known as one of the stars of Huffington Post's reality series, 'The New Activists' also appearing in MTV's Geordie OG's series one.

Hackett's debut book 'FEARLESS' was published by Scholastic in 2020.

Hackett is a regular contributor towards the global conversation surrounding technology and bullying and has advised the British, European and American Governments and speaks often at the United Nations in addition to writing for the United Nations about technological progression and challenges.

In 2017 he became the youngest person to receive an honorary degree from the University of Sussex.

Early life
Hackett grew up in St Helens, United Kingdom and experienced both physical and emotional bullying at school. In the last few years at his secondary school, he was physically assaulted outside of school, causing him to be hospitalised. Hackett has said in some interviews that the bullying he experienced was homophobic.

Hackett first came out as bisexual and, in his college years, he came out as gay. After college Hackett moved to Brighton to study business and management at the University of Sussex.

Ditch the Label 

In 2006, Hackett launched a Myspace profile to host conversations that were taking place following his and others' experiences with bullying and physical assault, naming it ‘Ditch the Label’. He received a grant from the St. Helens Chamber of Commerce to develop a dedicated Ditch the Label website to provide help and support to the victims of bullying. In 2012, he graduated from the University of Sussex with a degree in business and management; he registered Ditch the Label as a legal entity and began to formally develop the organisation, funding it with his own money.

In March 2014, Ditch the Label was officially recognised and registered as a charity in the UK. In 2016, Ditch the Label announced their international expansion into the United States  as "Ditch the Label" and to Mexico as "Deja Las Etiquetas". Shortly after, Ditch the Label gained 501(c)(3) status in the US and then opened their office in Los Angeles. Hackett splits his time between both offices.

Controversies 
In 2019, Hackett publicly called out Brighton Pride for their alleged discrimination against pride-goers with a disability after his relatives were confined to a 'disability tent' with no view of the stage. A backlash ensued with thousands turning to Twitter, with many sharing their own experiences and some calling for a complete boycott.

Accolades
Top 30 charity chief executive on social media
 Received a grant from St Helens Chamber of Commerce before he was 18, enabling him to launch the Ditch the Label website, this later evolved into the charity (2007)
 Shortlisted "Entrepreneur of the Year" and "Organisation of the Year" - National Diversity Awards (2013) 
 Fellow of Royal Society of Arts - FRSA (2014)
 Winner of "Best European Marketing Campaign 2014" in European Diversity Awards. (2014)
 Winner of  "Young Business Person of the Year" in the Sussex Business Awards for his work with Ditch the Label (2014)
 Winner of "European Campaigner of the Year" - Highly Commended in European Diversity Awards (2015) 
 Notable Alumni - University of Sussex
 Sits on the advisory board of the Anti-Bullying Alliance, of which Ditch the Label is a core member.
 Sits on the task force of the 5Rights initiative headed by The Children's commissioner for England.

References

External links
Ditch The Label
Liam Hackett official website

1991 births
Alumni of the University of Sussex
English LGBT rights activists
English gay men
People from St Helens, Merseyside
Living people
Anti-bullying activists